Hyalorisia galea is a species of small sea snail, a marine gastropod mollusc in the family Capulidae, the cap snails.

Distribution

Description 
The maximum recorded shell length is 18.5 mm.

Habitat 
Minimum recorded depth is 342 m. Maximum recorded depth is 768 m.

References

Capulidae
Gastropods described in 1889